Kochan (Slovak/Czech feminine: Kochanová) is a surname. Notable people with this surname include:

 Alexis Kochan (born 1953), Ukrainian-Canadian composer and singer
 Craig Kochan (born 1969), Canadian curler
 Dieter Kochan (born 1974), American ice hockey goaltender
 Günter Kochan (1930–2009), German classical composer
 Jacek Kochan (born 1955), Polish musician
 Lionel Kochan (1922–2005), British historian
 Nick Kochan, British journalist
 Magdalena Kochan (born 1950), Polish politician
 Matej Kochan (born 1992), Slovak footballer
 Monika Kochanová (born 1989), Slovak tennis player
 Rebekah Kochan (born 1984), American actress
 Thomas Anton Kochan (born 1947), American professor

See also
 

Polish-language surnames
Slovak-language surnames